Leila Khoury Barclay is an American storyteller, journalist and founder of Al-Hakawati ("The Storyteller"), an online provider dedicated to educating people on Arabic art, culture and history, in 2002. The site has been featured on Radio Orient in Paris, France and has also been used for teaching purposes in the Arabic department at the University of Pennsylvania.

Early life and career 

Born and raised in Beirut, Lebanon to an Iraqi mother and Palestinian father, Barclay had lived in Lebanon up until the Lebanese civil war began, leaving her to continue her studies in London. She later moved to the United States and gained both a bachelor's degree in mathematics and a master's degree in German literature from the Bryn Mawr College in Pennsylvania. Soon after she returned to Lebanon after graduating in 1982 and worked as a journalist in Beirut between the years 1982 to 1984 and produced a first issue entertainment guide for Lebanon; however, it failed to be published due to the circumstance of war.

Whilst returning to the States, she married David Barclay, whom she met at university. They both settled in New Jersey raising their four children.

References

External links 
 al-hakawati

Living people
Writers from Beirut
Lebanese emigrants to the United States
American storytellers
Women storytellers
American people of Iraqi descent
American people of Palestinian descent
Bryn Mawr College alumni
Year of birth missing (living people)
American women journalists
21st-century American women